Hot Country Songs is a chart that ranks the top-performing country music songs in the United States, published by Billboard magazine.  In 1981, 48 different singles topped the chart, then published under the title Hot Country Singles, in 52 issues of the magazine, based on playlists submitted by country music radio stations and sales reports submitted by stores.

Alabama, Razzy Bailey, T. G. Sheppard and Hank Williams Jr. tied for the most number ones of the year, with three chart-toppers each.  As Alabama's "Feels So Right" was one of the few songs to spend a second week at number one, the band had the highest total number of weeks in the top spot, with four.  Ten other acts achieved more than one number one in 1981.  Several acts topped the chart for the first time in 1981: Charly McClain with "Who's Cheatin' Who", Sylvia with "Drifter", Rosanne Cash with "Seven Year Ache", Earl Thomas Conley with "Fire and Smoke", Ronnie McDowell with "Older Women", Steve Wariner with "All Roads Lead to You", and the duo of David Frizzell and Shelly West with "You're the Reason God Made Oklahoma".  Shelly West's appearance at number one fell between two chart-toppers achieved in 1981 by her mother, Dottie West.

"King of Rock and Roll" Elvis Presley, who had died in 1977, achieved a posthumous number one in March with the single "Guitar Man".  Upon its original release in 1967, the song had been a minor hit on Billboard all-genres chart, the Hot 100.  More than three years after his death, however, the song was re-released to promote a similarly-titled album which combined existing Presley vocals with new instrumental backing tracks created in Nashville by producer Felton Jarvis, and this time became a country number one.  Two songs which topped the country chart consecutively in January also topped the Hot 100, albeit several weeks later.  Eddie Rabbitt's "I Love a Rainy Night" topped the country chart in the issue of Billboard dated January 10, and was replaced the following week by Dolly Parton's "9 to 5".  On the Hot 100, Parton's song reached the top in the issue dated February 21, was replaced by Rabbitt's song the following week, but then returned to the top spot in the issue dated March 14.  The two songs were among just four country songs which topped the Hot 100 during the 1980s, and the only two to do so consecutively.  Both songs, along with "I Don't Need You" by Kenny Rogers, also crossed over to adult contemporary radio with sufficient impact to top Billboards Adult Contemporary airplay chart, reflecting increasing pop and soft rock influences on mainstream country music.

Chart history

a.  Double A-sided single

See also
1981 in music
List of artists who reached number one on the U.S. country chart

References

1981
1981 record charts
Country